Klondike is an electoral district which returns a member (known as an MLA) to the Legislative Assembly of Yukon in Canada. One of Yukon's eight rural ridings, it is also the oldest riding in Yukon, first established in 1905. The riding includes Dawson City and its environs, as well as Eagle Plains.

Klondike was the only seat won by the Yukon Party in the 2000 territorial election and the only seat held by the Liberals prior to the 2016 territorial election.

Geography 
The constituency is named after the region of Klondike.

Members of the Territorial Council / Legislative Assembly

Election results

2021 general election

2016 general election

|-

| Liberal
| Sandy Silver
| align="right"| 687
| align="right"| 59.1%
| align="right"| +10.3%
|-

|-

| NDP
| Jay Farr
| align="right"| 111
| align="right"| 9.5%
| align="right"| -4.0%
|-
! align=left colspan=3|Total
! align=right| 1163
! align=right| 100.0%
! align=right| –
|}

2011 general election

|-

| Liberal
| Sandy Silver
| align="right"| 530
| align="right"| 48.8%
| align="right"| +34.1%
|-

|-

| NDP
| Jorn Meir
| align="right"| 147
| align="right"| 13.5%
| align="right"| -19.6%
|-
! align=left colspan=3|Total
! align=right| 1085
! align=right| 100.0%
! align=right| –
|}

2006 general election

|NDP
| Jorn Meier
|align="right"| 297
|align="right"| 33.1%
|align="right"| +11.8%
|-
 
| style="width: 130px" |Liberal
| Steve Taylor
|align="right"| 132
|align="right"| 14.7%
|align="right"| -9.2%
|-

| style="width: 130px" |Independent
| Glen Everitt
|align="right"| 56
|align="right"| 6.2%
|align="right"| +6.2%
|- bgcolor="white"
!align="left" colspan=3|Total
!align="right"| 898
!align="right"| 100.0%
!align="right"| –

2002 general election

|-

 
| style="width: 130px" |Liberal
| Glen Everitt
|align="right"| 224
|align="right"| 22.9%
|align="right"| -14.0%
|-

|NDP
| Lisa Hutton
|align="right"| 200
|align="right"| 21.3%
|align="right"| -1.9%
|- bgcolor="white"
!align="left" colspan=3|Total
!align="right"| 937
!align="right"| 100.0%
!align="right"| –

2000 general election

|-

|-
 
| style="width: 130px" |Liberal
| Stuart Schmidt
|align="right"| 397
|align="right"| 36.9%
|align="right"| +28.2%
|-

|NDP
| Aedes Scheer
|align="right"| 249
|align="right"| 23.2%
|align="right"| -10.7%
|-
|- bgcolor="white"
!align="left" colspan=3|Total
!align="right"| 1075
!align="right"| 100.0%
!align="right"| –

1996 general election

|-

|-

|NDP
| Tim Gerberding
|align="right"| 372
|align="right"| 33.9%
|align="right"| -12.0%
|-
 
| style="width: 130px" |Liberal
| Glen Everitt
|align="right"| 96
|align="right"| 8.8%
|align="right"| +8.8%
|-

| style="width: 130px" |Independent
| John Cramp
|align="right"| 21
|align="right"| 1.9%
|align="right"| +1.9%
|-
|- bgcolor="white"
!align="left" colspan=3|Total
!align="right"| 1099
!align="right"| 100.0%
!align="right"| –

1992 general election

|-

|-

| NDP
| Art Webster
| align="right"| 355
| align="right"| 45.9%
| align="right"| –
|-
! align=left colspan=3|Total
! align=right| 773
!align="right"| 100.0%
!align="right"| –
|}
 The Yukon Progressive Conservative Party re-branded itself the Yukon Party before the 1992 election.

1978 general election

|-

| NDP
| Fred Berger
| align="right"| 130
| align="right"| 32.8%
| align="right"|

| Independent
| Eleanor Millard
| align="right"| 114
| align="right"| 28.7%
| align="right"|
|-
! align=left colspan=4|Total
! align=right|
! align=right|
|}
Partisan politics introduced into the territory.

1922 general election

|-

| Independent
| John Ferrell
|colspan="2" align=center|Acclaimed
|}

1920 general election

|-

| Independent
| Paul S. Hogan
| align="right"| 254
| align="right"| 53.4%
| align="right"| –

| Independent
| Allan McMillan
| align="right"| 221
| align="right"| 46.5%
| align="right"| –
|-
! align=left colspan=3|Total
! align=right|475
! align=right|100%
! align=right| –
|}

1917 general election

|-

| Independent
| William Lowden
| align="right"| –
| align="right"| –
| align="right"| –
|-

| Independent
| Joseph McIntosh
| align="right"| –
| align="right"| –
| align="right"| –
|-

| Independent
| John Pickering
| align="right"| –
| align="right"| –
| align="right"| –
|-

| Independent
| James Wilson
| align="right"| –
| align="right"| –
| align="right"| –
|-
! align=left colspan=3|Total
! align=right| –
! align=right| –
! align=right| –
|}

Top two candidates declared elected.

References

Yukon territorial electoral districts